Intel X299, codenamed "Basin Falls", is a Platform Controller Hub (PCH) designed and manufactured by Intel, targeted at the high-end desktop (HEDT) or enthusiast segment of the Intel product lineup. The X299 chipset supports the Intel Core X-series processors, which are codenamed Skylake-X, 
Kaby Lake-X and Cascade Lake-X. All supported processors use the LGA 2066 socket. The X299 chipset was released in June 2017, with the Intel Core i9-7900X.

See also

 List of Intel chipsets

Features 
The X299 chipset uses the new Direct Media Interface (DMI) 3.0. 24 PCI Express 3.0 lanes are provided by the chipset, a sizable increase from the X99 chipset's 8 PCI-e 2.0 lanes.

Many features from the X99 chipset are carried over to the X299 chipset.

These include:
 M.2 
 USB 3.0 and 2.0 support
 Flexible I/O
 VT-d support
 SATA Express
 Overclocking

References

Intel chipsets